Gerisa is a town in the northwestern Awdal region of Somaliland.

Demographics 
It is populated by members of the Mahad 'Ase Gadabuursi and Issa subclans of the Somali Dir clan.

The FSAU Monthly Food Security Report March (2003) states that the Gadabuursi clan are the main local inhabitants of Gerisa whilst Issa pastoralists migrate to the region seasonally from Ethiopia:
"Following discussions with the Issa (from Ethiopia) and Gadabursi (local inhabitants) livestock owners and local leaders in Gerissa, Xariradd, Jidhi, Karuure, Ceel Gal, Zeyla, Lughaye, Kalalwe and Osooli."

In 1886 the British General and Assistant Political Resident at Zeila, JS King, visited Gerisa and stated that the town is inhabited by members of the Mahad 'Ase clan, and in particular the Bahabar Abokor subclan:
"At-4-20 P.M. we reached Gárisa, marked by a small hill on the right bank of a river-bed 180 yards wide. Here we found a village of the Rer Abdalla Muhammad family of the Rer Muhammad A'sa sub-tribe of the Gadabúrsi, the chief Akil of whom is, at present, Ali Girrhé."

See also
Administrative divisions of Somaliland
Regions of Somaliland
Districts of Somaliland

References

Geerisa District, Awdal

Populated places in Awdal